The Schurre (pronounced "shoorer") is a stone run in the Bode Gorge in the Lower Harz near Thale in Saxony-Anhalt, Germany. The stone run is slowly slipping downhill, the sliding of its boulders being audible especially during periods of heavy rain.

Its name has been given to a much-frequented trail, blazed in 1864 between the Bode Gorge and the legendary Rosstrappe site. In 18 hairpin bends the Schurre wends its way up the steep stone run. The trail has been extensively developed and is cobbled in places. Several trees planted along the route, with its extreme climatic conditions, have survived. Negotiating this route uphill from the valley requires walkers to be fit due to its steep gradient and the requirement to climb around 200 metres in height.
In May 2010 there was a rockslide that led to the path being closed for several months. The path was also closed in summer 2011 due to another major rockslide.

Harz
Hiking trails in Germany
Protected areas of Saxony-Anhalt
Landslides in Germany